North Scalp Creek is a stream system in the U.S. state of South Dakota.

Scalp Creek received its name from an incident when a man was scalped by Sioux Indians.

See also
List of rivers of South Dakota
South Scalp Creek

References

Rivers of Gregory County, South Dakota
Rivers of South Dakota